The 1938–39 Drexel Dragons men's basketball team represented Drexel Institute of Technology during the 1938–39 men's basketball season. The Dragons, led by 7th year head coach Ernest Lange, played their home games at Curtis Hall Gym and were members of the Eastern Pennsylvania Collegiate Basketball League (EPCBL).

Roster

Schedule

|-
!colspan=12 style=| Exhibition
|-

|-
!colspan=9 style=| Regular season
|-

Awards
Bill Kulesh
EPCBL All-Conference Second Team

References

Drexel Dragons men's basketball seasons
Drexel
Drexel Dragons Men's Basketball
Drexel Dragons Men's Basketball